An Account of the Entry of the Catholic Religion into Sichuan, also referred to as Mission to Sichuan, is a 1918 history book edited by Paris Foreign Missions Society missionary François-Marie-Joseph Gourdon in Chinese, and published by Sheng Chia Book-Printing Bureau in the city of Chongqing (then known as Chungking).

Synopsis 

Editions 
The first edition contains 76 pages, published in Chongqing by Sheng Chia Book-Printing Bureau, aimed at Catholics in east Sichuan, hence is limited to only 2000 copies. A Chronicle by Mister Wuma was added to the end of the reprint edition, making a total of 139 pages. This version is limited to 3200 copies, published for historical research only.

The editor 
François-Marie-Joseph Gourdon was born around 1840. He was sent to Chongqing by the Paris Foreign Missions Society in 1866, he died there around 1930. During his station in Chongqing, Gourdon became abbot of the largest among several abbeys that he established. In 1904, he co-founded the Catholic newspaper  with a certain Frenchman Lonis. An Account was edited and noted by Gourdon based on a hand-copy manuscript given to him by a Jesuit in Shanghai, which containing detailed accounts of the first Catholic mission in Sichuan carried out by Gabriel de Magalhães and Lodovico Buglio, and allegedly being Magalhães's . In 1918, the book was published by the authority of the Bishop of Eastern Szechwan, .

Reception 
On NetEase, a review says: 'The book provides valuable first-hand historical materials for the study of Zhang Xianzhong's '. Zheng Guanglu, a Sichuanese writer from Chengdu, remarked that the book is one of the hard evidences of the Sichuan massacre carried out by Zhang Xianzhong, in contrast to the false claim made by some historians that the massacre was fabricated by feudal landlord class out of instinctive hatred against peasant class.

See also 
 Catholic Church in Sichuan
 List of massacres in China

References 

1918 non-fiction books
20th-century history books
History books about Catholicism
History books about the Ming dynasty
Books on Christian missions
Chinese non-fiction books
Catholic Church in Sichuan
Jesuit China missions
History of the Catholic Church
History of Christianity in Sichuan
Works by French people